Arlene Sellers (September 7, 1921 – March 5, 2004) was an American real estate developer and film producer. She frequently worked with fellow producer Alex Winitsky.

Sellers died of cancer at age 82.

Filmography
She was a producer in all films unless otherwise noted.

Film

Miscellaneous crew

Television

References

External links
 

1921 births
2004 deaths
People from Cleveland
People from Los Angeles
University of Michigan alumni
UC Berkeley School of Law alumni
American film producers
Real estate and property developers
Deaths from cancer